This is a list of the National Register of Historic Places listings in Apache County, Arizona.  It is intended to be a complete list of the properties and districts on the National Register of Historic Places in Apache County, Arizona, United States.  The locations of National Register properties and districts for which the latitude and longitude coordinates are included below, may be seen in a map.

There are 33 properties and districts listed on the National Register in the county, including 7 that are also National Historic Landmarks.

Listings county-wide

|}

Former listings

|}

See also

 List of National Historic Landmarks in Arizona
 National Register of Historic Places listings in Arizona

References

Apache
N